Vilambaram is a 2019 Indian Tamil-language film directed by Suriyanithi and produced by Joseph Stalin. It stars Abhinay Vaddi, Haira and Aishwarya Rajesh. Featuring music composed by J. Vimal, the film began production in mid-2012 was released in March 2019.

Cast
Abhinay Vaddi as Ashvin / Santhosh
Haira as Sharanya
Aishwarya Rajesh as Aishwarya
Thambi Ramaiah as Gem Ad Agency owner
Bhuvana
Rithish
Suman Shetty
Scissor Manohar
Benjamin
Sona Heiden as an item number "Yennai Yenda"

Production
The film's producer Joseph Stalin, an entrepreneur, met director Suriyanithi through the co-producer of the film, V. P. Ramakrishnan, and agreed to finance his debut film. Suriyanithi had previously apprenticed under directors including K. Balachander, Yaar Kannan and Sundar K. Vijayan. The makers decided to cast actor Abhinay Vaddi after seeing him in Dasari Narayana Rao's Young India (2010), and Vilambaram was the first Tamil film that he signed on to appear in. The film was shot throughout late 2012 and early 2013 in Kuala Lumpur and Putrajaya, with actresses Haira and Aishwarya Rajesh also joining the cast. Rajesh played a glamorous character in the film.

Following Aishwarya Rajesh's appearances in Rummy (2014) and Pannaiyarum Padminiyum (2014), she had become a known presence in the Tamil film industry. The producers subsequently increased her visibility in the film's promotional material and tried to pass her off as the film's lead actress in July 2014. Aishwarya later spoke out against the makers, suggesting that she had only appeared in a small role in the film and that the promoters were misrepresenting her involvement in the project.  The film continued to be delayed and unreleased for five further years, before being released in 2019.

Soundtrack 
The soundtrack is composed by J. Vimal Raj. He previously worked on the score for the film Senthoora Poove and the director of this film, Suriyanithi, worked as an assistant director for the film.

"Azhagazhagai" - Harish Raghavendra
"Chevvaai Malarntha" - Shravya
"Yennai Yenda" - Priya Himesh, Velmurugan (lyrics by J. Vimal Raj)
"Vilambaram"  - Ranjith
"Vilambaram"  - J. Vimal Raj

Release 
The film released on 1 March 2019 along with 90 ML, Dha Dha 87, Thirumanam, and Thadam. The film went unnoticed at the box office.

References

External links

2019 films
Films shot in Malaysia
2010s Tamil-language films